Muon capture is the capture of a negative muon by a proton, usually resulting in production of a neutron and a neutrino, and sometimes a gamma photon.

Muon capture by heavy nuclei often leads to emission of particles; most often neutrons, but charged particles can be emitted as well.

Ordinary muon capture (OMC) involves capture of a negative muon from the atomic orbital without emission of a gamma photon:

 +  → μ + 

Radiative muon capture (RMC) is a radiative version of OMC, where a gamma photon is emitted:
 +  → μ +  + 

Theoretical motivation for the study of muon capture on the proton is its connection to the proton's induced pseudoscalar form factor gp.

Practical application - Nuclear waste disposal 
Muon capture is being investigated for practical application in radioactive waste disposal, for example in the artificial transmutation of large quantities of long-lived radioactive waste that have been produced globally by fission reactors. Radioactive waste can be transmuted to stable isotopes following irradiation by an incident muon beam from a compact proton accelerator source.

References
    
    
 Nagamine, Kanetada (2016) "Nuclear Waste Disposal Method and its apparatus using muon-nuclear-absorption". (WO2016143144A1) Espacenet (Patent database).

Nuclear physics